Barbados competed at the 1972 Summer Olympics in Munich, West Germany. 13 competitors, 8 men and 5 women, took part in 13 events in 4 sports.

Athletics

Men's Competition
Caspar Springer   
Clifford Brooks

Women's Competition
Marcia Trotman  
Barbara Bishop  
Lorna Forde  
Heather Gooding  
Freida Nicholls-Davy

Cycling

Three men represented Barbados in 1972.

Individual road race
 Kensley Reece — did not finish (→ no ranking)
 Hector Edwards — did not finish (→ no ranking)
 Orlando Bates — did not finish (→ no ranking)

Sprint
 Hector Edwards
 Kensley Reece

1000m time trial
 Hector Edwards

Individual pursuit
 Orlando Bates

Shooting

Two male shooters represented Barbados in 1972.

50 m rifle, prone
 Milton Tucker  
 Cavour Morris

Weightlifting

Anthony Phillips

References

External links
Official Olympic Reports

Nations at the 1972 Summer Olympics
1972
Olympics